Karl-Heinz Krahl (25 September 1914 – 14 April 1942) was a Luftwaffe ace and recipient of the Knight's Cross of the Iron Cross during World War II.  The Knight's Cross of the Iron Cross was awarded to recognise extreme battlefield bravery or successful military leadership.  Karl-Heinz Krahl was shot down 14 April 1942, by anti-aircraft fire from the defenses at RAF Luqa during the Siege of Malta.  During his career he is credited with between 19 - 24 aerial victories, all against Western forces.

Career
On 5 September 1940, Krahl succeeded Oberleutnant Helmut Wick as Staffelkapitän (squadron leader) of 3. Staffel of JG 2. Wick had been appointed Gruppenkommandeur (group commander) of I. Gruppe of JG 2. When Wick was appointed Geschwaderkommodore (wing commander) of JG 2 on 20 October, Krahl succeeded him as Gruppenkommandeur of I. Gruppe.

Krahl was transferred and appointed Gruppenkommandeur of II. Gruppe of Jagdgeschwader 3 "Udet" (JG 3—3rd Fighter Wing) on 21 November 1941. He succeeded Hauptmann Gordon Gollob who was transferred. Command of I. Gruppe of JG 2 was passed to Hauptmann Ignaz Prestele. On 14 April 1942, he was shot down and killed in action in his Messerschmitt Bf 109 F-4 (Werknummber 8784—factory number) by anti-aircraft artillery near Luqa, Malta. The next day, he was replaced by Major Kurt Brändle as commander of II. Gruppe. Following World War II, Krahl was reinterred at the German War Cemetery in Cagliari, the capital of the island of Sardinia.

Summary of career

Aerial victory claims
According to Obermaier, Krahl was with 24 aerial victories. Mathews and Foreman, authors of Luftwaffe Aces — Biographies and Victory Claims, researched the German Federal Archives and found records for 19 aerial victory claims, all of which claimed on the Western Front.

Awards
 Spanish Cross in Gold with Swords (14 April 1939)
 Aviator badge
 Front Flying Clasp of the Luftwaffe
 Iron Cross (1939) 2nd and 1st Class
 Knight's Cross of the Iron Cross on 13 November 1940 as Hauptmann and Gruppenkommandeur of the I./Jagdgeschwader 2 "Richthofen"

References

Citations

Bibliography

External links
Aces of the Luftwaffe
Luftwaffe 1939–1945 History

1914 births
1942 deaths
Military personnel from Wrocław
People from the Province of Silesia
German World War II flying aces
German military personnel of the Spanish Civil War
Recipients of the Knight's Cross of the Iron Cross
Aviators killed by being shot down
Luftwaffe personnel killed in World War II
Condor Legion personnel